Facundo Bagnis was the defending champion but chose not to defend his title.

Marcelo Arévalo won the title after defeating Daniel Elahi Galán 7–5, 6–4 in the final.

Seeds

Draw

Finals

Top half

Bottom half

References
Main Draw
Qualifying Draw

Open Bogotá - Singles
2017 Singles